Edwin L. Moore (May 26, 1916 – July 10, 2009) was a researcher for the United States Department of Agriculture (USDA). With Louis G. MacDowell and C. D. Atkins in the 1940s, he helped develop a new process for making frozen concentrated orange juice. Moore was inducted into the Florida Agricultural Hall of Fame in 1986 for his contributions to the Citrus Industry and was inducted into the Florida Citrus Hall of Fame in 1983.

Background
Moore was born in Springfield, Massachusetts, in 1916. When Moore was a child, he experimented once by growing a grapefruit tree in his basement, it eventually died, but it encouraged his interest in food technology. He also worked at a grocery store when he was young. Moore went on to attend Massachusetts State College, earning a bachelor, masters, and finally a doctorate in food technology in 1942.

After graduating from college, Moore joined the Florida Citrus Commission where he joined the research team of Dr. Louis G. MacDowell and Cedric "C.D." Atkins. They were assigned to find a viable form of an orange juice concentrate that could deliver Vitamin C to soldiers in Europe to help fight scurvy. They were given $8,000, equipment with the sophistication of a high school chemistry lab, and assigned to an old USDA lab in Winter Haven, Florida. Their research would also be of benefit to the citrus industry in Florida.

Project
The research started in 1942 and it took three years for MacDowell, Moore and Atkins to perfect a method of producing frozen concentrated orange juice that is still utilized today. The process of concentration that was previously being used involved heating the juice so that the water would evaporate. The three researchers invented a process called the cutback process, in which the flavor of orange juice was retained by adding a bit of fresh juice to the concentrate and then freezing it. This new process restored some of the Vitamin C that was lost in heating, thereby creating a more nutritious product. The process helped accelerate the growth of citrus production in Florida and helped create the frozen food industry.

After the project
Moore went to the Citrus Research Center in Lake Alfred to enhance commercial evaporation methods and also studied the chemical characteristics of the new juice. A patent was awarded in 1948 on the process they developed, but it was claimed by the USDA, which cited the use of its facilities. Moore's work on the project helped establish minimum quality standards for frozen concentrated orange juice.

Moore was also a participant in studies at the Lake Alfred research center, and was considered the world's leading expert in the vitamin and nutrient content of citrus. He also worked to develop more energy-efficient equipment, in pollution control, in waste disposal, and the use of citrus by-products. Moore's research career lasted into his eighties. He finally retired in 2001 and moved to Lake Alfred where he died on July 10, 2009.

Awards and accolades
Moore earned several awards and accolades, including:
Distinguished Service Award from the U.S.D.A (along with MacDowell and Atkins)
Named one of the 50 most important Floridians of the century by the Lakeland Ledger.
Distinguished Merit Award from the National Wholesale Frozen Food Distributor Association.
Florida Agricultural Hall of Fame (inducted in 1986).
Florida Citrus Hall of Fame (inducted in 1983).

Image and caption

See also

Orange juice
Orange (fruit)
Juice
Food grading

References

External links
Citrus Research and Education Center
Oranges: Safe Methods to Store, Preserve, and Enjoy. University of California Agriculture and Natural Resources.

American food scientists
People from Winter Haven, Florida
University of Massachusetts Amherst alumni
2009 deaths
Fruit juice
Food processing
Food science
1916 births
People from Polk County, Florida